Haroshet or Harosheth ("smithy") may refer to:

Kiryat Haroshet, now part of Kiryat Tiv'on, Israel
Harosheth Haggoyim, fortress in middle East described in the Book of Judges

See also
Haroset, Jewish sweet paste